Gary Sadler (born 1962), is a male retired cyclist who competed for England.

Cycling career
He represented England in the 1 km time trial and won a bronze medal in the 4,000 metres team pursuit with Darryl Webster, Shaun Wallace, Tony Mayer and Paul Curran, at the 1982 Commonwealth Games in Brisbane, Queensland, Australia.

Sadler was a six times British track champion, winning the British National Individual Sprint Championships in 1988, the British National Individual Time Trial Championships in 1980 & 1982, the British National Team Pursuit Championships in 1980, the in British National Scratch Championships in 1982 and the British National Keirin Championships in 1988.

References

1962 births
English male cyclists
Commonwealth Games medallists in cycling
Commonwealth Games bronze medallists for England
Cyclists at the 1982 Commonwealth Games
Living people
Medallists at the 1982 Commonwealth Games